CJSN (1490 AM) is a radio station broadcasting a country format. Licensed to Shaunavon, Saskatchewan, it serves southwestern Saskatchewan. It first began broadcasting in 1966. The station is currently owned by Golden West Broadcasting.

External links
CJSN 1490
 

Jsn
Jsn
Jsn
Radio stations established in 1966
1966 establishments in Saskatchewan